Nervous may refer to:
 Nervousness
 Nervous system, a network of cells in an animal's body that coordinates movement and the senses
 Nervous tissue, the cells of the nervous system that work in aggregate to transmit signals

Music
 "Nervous" (Gene Summers song), 1958; covered by several performers
 "Nervous" (Gavin James song), 2016
 "Nervous" (Shawn Mendes song), 2018
 "Nervous", a song by K.Flay from Solutions, 2019
 "Nervous", a song by L Devine, 2018
 "Nervous", a song by Nick Jonas from Spaceman, 2021
 Nervous Records, a UK record label
 Nervous Records (US), a US record label

See also
 "Nervousness", a song by the Gigolo Aunts from Tales from the Vinegar Side
 Nervous Norvus (1912–1968), the performing name of Jimmy Drake
 Nervous shark, a species of requiem shark